Assandira is a novel by Giulio Angioni, published in 2004 by Sellerio.

Summary 
The old Sardinian shepherd Costantino Saru has been persuaded by his son and his Danish daughter in law to establish a hotel restaurant (called Assandira) in his abandoned barn. The characteristic of the company should be to offer European customers, especially from the north, an experience of life in the traditional pastoral world of Sardinia, where the old shepherd Costantino should be a kind of guarantor of authenticity. The company thrives and even Costantino feels at ease playing the part of the ancient Mediterranean shepherd. But one day a fire destroys Assandira, kills his son and causes abortion of her daughter in law. Costantino feels responsible and confesses to the investigator. The reason for his self-attribution of responsibility is not clear to the judge, who does not believe in such a self-incrimination, since his sharing the very idea of reliving the past in order to entertain the tourists.

Editions 
 2004, 
 2012 eBook,

See also 

 Sardinian Literary Spring
 Giulio Angioni
 Sa Laurera

Notes

Sources 
 E. Hall, Greek tragedy and the politics of subjectivity in recent fiction, "Classical Receptions Journal",  1 (1), 23-42, Oxford University Press, 2009.
 G. Pias, La casa della palma e Assandira: due "gialli" sulla memoria e l'identità, in Sabina Gola e Laura Rorato (cura), La forma del passato. Questioni di identità in opere letterarie e cinematografiche italiane a partire dagli ultimi anni Ottanta, Bruxelles, Bern, Berlin, Frankfurt am Main, New York, Oxford, Wien, Peter Lang, 2007, 261-274. .  
 H. Klüver, Gebrauchsanweisungen für Sardinien, München, Piper Verlag, 2012, 194-212.
 F. Manai, Cosa succede a Fraus? Sardegna e mondo nel racconto di Giulio Angioni, Cagliari, CUEC, 2006.
 B. Wagner, Sardinien, Insel im Dialog. Texte, Diskurse, Filme, Tübingen, Francke Verlag, 2008.

External links 
 Podcast 'Assandira' Fahrenheit Radio3 - Live
 Italialibri
 Massimo Cappitti, L'indice dei libri del mese

Sardinia in fiction
2004 Italian novels
Novels set in Italy